Le Grand Cirque (1968) is an oil on canvas painting by Belarusian-French artist Marc Chagall created in 1968.

Description 
On this painting, Chagall focuses on the ring or center stage as a mythical winged figures looks down upon the spectacle from on high. The subject of circus was dear to the artist. Chagall often returned to the circus as a subject matter in his artworks. He considered clowns, acrobats and actors as tragically human beings who are like characters in certain religious paintings. Among other Post-Impressionist and Modern painters who featured the circus in their works are Seurat, Toulouse-Lautrec, Picasso, Rouault, Van Dongen and Léger. Le Grand Cirque (1968) is considered Chagall’s most grand exploration of the circus as a subject for his paintings.

Provenance 
Pierre Matisse Gallery, New York acquired the painting from the artist shortly after he completed it. The painting was first exhibited in New York in December 1968, and then was kept in Pierre Matisse Gallery’s collection for several years, exhibiting at some of the most important retrospectives of the artist’s work, including the definitive exhibition at the Royal Academy of Arts in 1985. In May 1998, the painting was sold to private collection at Sotheby’s, New York.

Exhibitions 

 New York, Pierre Matisse Gallery, Marc Chagall, Recent Paintings, 1966-1968, 1968, no. 23
 New York, Solomon R. Guggenheim Museum, 1975
 New York, Pierre Matisse Gallery, Marc Chagall, A Celebration, 1977, no. 11
 Sarasota, John and Mable Ringling Museum of Art, The Circus in Art, 1977
 Milwaukee Museum of Art; Columbus Museum of Art;  Albany, New York State Museum; Washington, D.C., Corcoran Gallery of Art,  Center Ring: The Artist. Two Centuries of Circus Art, 1981-82, no. 29
 London, Royal Academy of Arts: Philadelphia Museum of Art, Chagall, 1985, no. 110

See also
List of artworks by Marc Chagall

References 

1968 paintings
Paintings by Marc Chagall
Clowns in art